The Horsemen Project is the first studio album released by the hip hop supergroup The HRSMN through Think Differently Music/Proverbs Music Inc. in October 20, 2003.

The album itself is rare as only a limited number of copies were produced.

Track listing

References

2003 albums
Canibus albums
Ras Kass albums
Hip hop albums by American artists